Duke Hayward (born Bernard Charles Hayward, January 14, 1880 – October 30, 1918) was a British cinematographer who worked in Hollywood during the silent era. His career was cut short by his untimely death in 1918 at the age of 38 from the Spanish flu.

Biography 
Bernard Charles Hayward was born in Hampton Wick, England, to Charles Hayward and Emily Henriques. He arrived in Los Angeles around 1904 and began working as a photographer for the Hearst newspaper chain before trying his hand as a cinematographer in the early days of the motion picture industry. He died in 1918 of the Spanish flu in Los Angeles; his wife, screenwriter Lillie Hayward, had given birth to a daughter just weeks earlier.

Selected filmography 

 The Marriage Lie (1918)
 The Wine Girl (1918)
 The Girl in the Dark (1918)
 Beloved Jim (1917)
 Fear Not (1917)
 The Birth of Patriotism (1917)
 The Flower of Doom (1917)
 The Pulse of Life (1917)
 Black Orchids (1917)
 The Chalice of Sorrow (1916)
 The Beckoning Trail (1916)
 The Silent Battle (1916)
 Naked Hearts (1916)
 A Yankee from the West (1915)

References 

British cinematographers
1880 births
1918 deaths
Deaths from the Spanish flu pandemic in California
British expatriates in the United States